Gordon Mitchell (born c. 1933) was a Canadian football player who played for the BC Lions.

References

Living people
1933 births
Players of Canadian football from Alberta
Canadian football tackles
BC Lions players
Canadian football people from Edmonton